Riama striata, the striped lightbulb lizard, is a species of lizard in the family Gymnophthalmidae. It is endemic to Colombia.

References

Riama
Reptiles of Colombia
Endemic fauna of Colombia
Reptiles described in 1863
Taxa named by Wilhelm Peters